2-Phenylphenol, or o-phenylphenol, is an organic compound.  In terms of structure, it is one of the monohydroxylated isomers of biphenyl.   It is a white solid. It is a biocide used as a preservative with E number E231 and under the trade names Dowicide, Torsite, Fungal, Preventol, Nipacide and many others.

Uses
The primary use of 2-phenylphenol is as an agricultural fungicide.  It is generally applied post-harvest. It is a fungicide used for waxing citrus fruits. It is no longer a permitted food additive in the European Union, but is still allowed as a post-harvest treatment in 4 EU countries.

It is also used for disinfection of seed boxes. It is a general surface disinfectant, used in households, hospitals, nursing homes, farms, laundries, barber shops, and food processing plants. It can be used on fibers and other materials. It is used to disinfect hospital and veterinary equipment. Other uses are in rubber industry and as a laboratory reagent.  It is also used in the manufacture of other fungicides, dye stuffs, resins and rubber chemicals.

2-Phenylphenol is found in low concentrations in some household products such as spray disinfectants and aerosol or spray underarm deodorants.

The sodium salt of orthophenyl phenol, sodium orthophenyl phenol, is a preservative, used to treat the surface of citrus fruits.

Orthophenyl phenol is also used as a fungicide in food packaging and may migrate into the contents.

Preparation
It is prepared by condensation of cyclohexanone to give cyclohexenylcyclohexanone.  The latter undergoes dehydrogenation to give 2-phenylphenol.

Safety
LD50 (rats) is 2700 to 3000 mg/kg.

References

External links
 List of brand name products which contain 2-phenylphenol 
 National Center for Biotechnology Information 2-Phenylphenol - Substance Summary

Phenols
Household chemicals
Fungicides
Antiseptics
Fumigants
Preservatives
Biphenyls